Phymatocera is a genus of sawflies belonging to the family Tenthredinidae.

Species:
 Phymatocera aterrima

References

Tenthredinidae
Sawfly genera